Kenmore Square is a square in Boston, Massachusetts, consisting of the intersection of several main avenues (including Beacon Street and Commonwealth Avenue) as well as several other cross streets, and Kenmore station, an MBTA subway stop. Kenmore Square is close to or abuts Boston University and Fenway Park, and it features Lansdowne Street, a center of Boston nightlife, and the Citgo sign. It is also the eastern terminus of U.S. Route 20, the longest U.S. Highway.

History

In early Colonial times the land that is now Kenmore Square was an uninhabited corner of the mainland where the narrow Charles River fed into the wide, marshy Back Bay. It was part of the colonial settlement of Boston until 1705, when the hamlet of Muddy River incorporated as the independent town of Brookline.  The land ended up in Brookline because the Muddy River - several blocks to the east - formed the eastern border of the new city.

An 1821 map shows the area known as Sewell's Point, with Great Dam, Brighton Road (Brighton Ave and Commonwealth Ave), and Punch Bowl Road (now Brookline Ave) intersecting at Sewell's Point then connected to the mainland to the west, in addition to the southern connection shown in 1777.

The portion of Beacon Street west of Governor Square was laid out in 1850, intersecting with Avenue Street (now the Allston portion of Commonwealth Avenue), Mill Dam Road (now Brookline Avenue), and Western Avenue, a road traversing the Back Bay mill dam in approximately the modern location of Beacon Street.  The Boston and Worcester Rail Road and the Charles River Branch Railroad combined here to cross the Back Bay on a separate railroad bridge, making a beeline for the Leather District.  The railroad lines still exist on more or less their original alignments, with the city developing around them.  Minor adjustments have been made for the construction of South Station, what is now the MBTA Green Line, and the Massachusetts Turnpike.

The town of Brighton was merged with Boston in 1874, and the Boston-Brookline line was redrawn to connect the new Back Bay neighborhood with Allston-Brighton.

Even as late as 1880, Governor Square was only sparsely developed.  By 1890, the Back Bay landfill project had reached the square, for the first time fully connecting it with parts of the city to the east.

Streetcar tracks were laid on Beacon Street in 1888, passing through Governor Square on the surface, from Coolidge Corner to Massachusetts Avenue.  These would eventually become the Green Line C branch.  Tracks were laid on what by then was called Commonwealth Avenue in 1896, from Union Square in Brighton.  These would later serve the Green Line A branch and Green Line B branch. The Boylston Street subway was extended to Kenmore Square in 1914, where it rose above ground. In 1932, the Kenmore Square portion of the Green Line was put underground, and branch portals opened at Blandford and St. Mary's Streets.

The square was originally Governor Square; it was changed to Kenmore Square on December 31, 1931. The new name was taken from the streetcar stop, itself named for the short Kenmore Street.

In 1915, the Kenmore Apartments were built on the corner of Kenmore and Commonwealth Avenue. Later, the apartments became the Hotel Kenmore with 400 guest rooms. The Kenmore was owned by Bertram Druker, a prominent Boston developer and was known as the baseball hotel. It housed every one of the 14 out of town teams in Major League Baseball teams in the years following World War II. From the 1960s to 1979 it was used by Grahm Junior College as a residence hall, cafeteria, library, and classroom facility.  Later, after Grahm Junior College closed and larger hotels like the Sheraton were built, the Hotel Kenmore started to show its age and eventually became apartments again. It is now called Kenmore Abbey.

See also
 Boston University
 Fenway–Kenmore
 Grahm Junior College
 Shell Oil Company "Spectacular" Sign

References

Further reading

External links
 Kenmore Square Memorial Facebook Page

Boston Red Sox
Fenway–Kenmore
Squares in Boston
U.S. Route 20